The 2009 IIHF Inline Hockey World Championship Division I was an international inline hockey tournament run by the International Ice Hockey Federation. The Division I tournament ran alongside the 2009 IIHF Inline Hockey World Championship and took place between 7 and 13 June 2009 in Ingolstadt, Germany at the Saturn Arena and Saturn Rink 2. The tournament was won by Austria who upon winning gained promotion to the 2010 IIHF Inline Hockey World Championship. While South Africa and Chinese Taipei were relegated to the continental qualifications after losing their relegation round games.

Qualification
Three teams attempted to qualify for the two remaining spots in the 2009 IIHF Inline Hockey World Championship Division I tournament. The other six nations automatically qualified based on their results from the 2008 Championship and 2008 Division I tournaments. Chinese Taipei qualified as the Asian-Oceanian qualifier. South Africa qualified after defeating Namibia on aggregate in a best-of-two qualification series. The games were held on 24 and 30 August 2008 in Namibia and South Africa with South Africa winning the first 3–2 and tying the second 1–1.

 - Finished fourth in 2008 World Championship Division I
 - Relegated from the 2008 World Championship
 - Finished third in 2008 World Championship Division I
 - Asian-Oceanian qualifier
 - Finished second in 2008 World Championship Division I
 - Finished sixth in 2008 World Championship Division I
 - Finished fifth in 2008 World Championship Division I
 - Winner of Namibia/South Africa qualification series

Seeding and groups
The seeding in the preliminary round was based on the final standings at the 2008 IIHF Inline Hockey World Championship and 2008 IIHF Inline Hockey World Championship Division I, and the qualification tournaments. Division I's groups are named Group C and Group D while the 2009 IIHF Inline Hockey World Championship use Group A and Group B, as both tournaments are held in Ingolstadt, Germany. The teams were grouped accordingly by seeding at the previous year's tournament (in parenthesis is the corresponding seeding):

Group C
 (9)
 (12)
 (13)
 (16)

Group D
 (10)
 (11)
 (14)
 (15)

Preliminary round
Eight participating teams were placed in the following two groups. After playing a round-robin, the top two teams advance to the Qualifying round where they face-off against the two last-placed teams of the Groups A and B from the Top Division tournament for a chance to participate in the Top Division playoffs. Teams finishing second through to fourth advance to the Playoff round.

All times are local (UTC+2).

Group C

Group D

Qualifying round
Austria and Brazil advanced to the qualifying round after finishing first in Group C and Group D respectively. Austria faced off against Canada, who finished last in Group A of the Top Division tournament, and Brazil was drawn against Slovakia, who finished last in Group B of the Top Division tournament, for a chance to participate in the Top Division playoffs. Both Austria and Brazil lost their matches and advanced to the Division I playoffs, while Canada and Slovakia advanced to the Top Division playoffs.

All times are local (UTC+2).

Playoff round
Austria and Brazil advanced to the playoff round after losing their qualifying round matches. They were seeded alongside the six other teams of the tournament based on their results in the preliminary round. The four winning quarterfinalists advanced to the semifinals while the losing teams moved on to the relegation round. In the relegation round Chinese Taipei and South Africa lost their games to Australia and Japan respectively and were relegated to the continental qualifications. In the semifinals Great Britain defeated Brazil and Austria beat Hungary, both advancing to the gold medal game. After losing the semifinals Brazil and Hungary played off for the bronze medal with Brazil winning 4–3. Austria defeated Great Britain 2–1 in the gold medal game and earned promotion to the 2010 IIHF Inline Hockey World Championship.

All times are local (UTC+2).

Quarterfinals

Relegation round

Semifinals

Bronze medal game

Gold medal game

Ranking and statistics

Final standings
The final standings of the tournament according to IIHF:

Scoring leaders

List shows the top skaters sorted by points, then goals. If the list exceeds 10 skaters because of a tie in points, all of the tied skaters are shown. Games from the qualifying round do not count towards the Division I statistics.

Leading goaltenders

Only the top five goaltenders, based on save percentage, who have played at least 40% of their team's minutes are included in this list. Games from the qualifying round do not count towards the Division I statistics.

References

External links
Division I at IIHF.com

IIHF Inline Hockey World Championship Division I
2009 in inline hockey
IIHF InLine Hockey World Championship
IIHF Inline Hockey World Championship Division I
Sports competitions in Ingolstadt
June 2009 sports events in Europe
Inline hockey in Germany